Yoshihiro Yasuda (安田 好弘 Yasuda Yoshihiro, born December 4, 1947) is a famed and controversial lawyer in Japan who is known for his anti-death penalty activism.  With the death penalty being a prominent method of prosecution in the Japanese judicial system for violent criminals, Yasuda has a history of defending many of these criminals as he wishes to prevent the death penalty from being imposed. As an advocate for the abolition of the death penalty, Yasuda has been able to successfully prevent a large number of death sentences from being handed down in his career. At the time Yasuda took on many of these violent cases, such cases were seen as damaging to a lawyer's career, and therefore, there existed only a small number of lawyers who took on such cases because many feared the media bashing, and could not expect much compensation. A significant number of these cases were then defended by Yasuda, and this concentration was viewed as problematic by some critics. He took part in many of these controversial trials because he believed that the suspects were tried unfairly as a result of mass media coverage. Yasuda is also known to reject television appearances for he dislikes the mass media.

Background 
Yoshihiro Yasuda was born in Hyogo Prefecture on December 4, 1947. He graduated Hitotsubashi University Faculty of Law in 1975. In 1977, Yasuda passed the bar exam, and in 1980, he officially became a lawyer after completing the Supreme Court Legal Research and Training Institute.

Criminal cases

Shinjuku bus attack 
Yasuda was one of the defenders of a Shinjuku bus attacker who killed six people in 1980. The attacker wasn't sentenced to death, but he died by suicide in 1997.

Japan Air Lines Flight 404 
Japan Air Lines Flight 404 was an airliner hijacked by Palestinian and Japanese terrorists on July 20, 1973.   As of 1987, Yasuda was elected to the counsel of the accused (Osamu Maruoka). Osamu Maruoka was sentenced to life imprisonment.

Aum Shinrikyo case 
Shoko Asahara, the founder of the religious cult group Aum Shinrikyo, was trialed as the mastermind behind the crime perpetrated by his followers, which included the Tokyo subway sarin gas attack. Yasuda was the court-appointed attorney to defend Asahara in 1995, but was forced to quit the team in 1997 due to his arrest for obstruction of the compulsory execution concerning a corporation for which he was an advisor (See arrest of Yasuda).  Some critics pointed out that this accusation was implemented because prosecutors were angry at Yasuda's court tactics to delay the trial as long as possible to avoid the sentence of a highly possible death penalty for Asahara. 1,200 lawyers listed as Yasuda's defenders, and Japan Federation of Bar Associations and Amnesty International protested that this accusation was unfair. After his legal complications were settled in 2003, Yasuda became Asahara's private lawyer, and in September 15, 2006, the Supreme Court handed down the original judgement of the death penalty on Asahara.

Masumi Hayashi (poisoner) 
Yasuda defended Masumi Hayashi, who was convicted of putting poison in a pot of curry being served at a 1998 summer festival in the Sonobe district of Wakayama, Wakayama, Japan.  Yasuda was asked by Kazuyoshi Miura, who was exchanging letters with Masumi Hayashi, to work on this trial. Despite Yasuda's efforts, she was sentenced to death in 2002.

Hikari City homicides 
Yasuda is the chief defender for a 19-year-old boy accused and sentenced to death by the Hiroshima High Court in April 2008 for raping and strangling a woman to death and murdering her one-year-old daughter in 1999 in Hikari city, Yamaguchi. This case has received much attention because of the circumstances of the crime and the possibility of the death penalty being imposed on a minor (the age of majority in Japan is 20). The Supreme Court ruled that perpetrator's age at the time of the crime did not exempt him from the death penalty. Yasuda and the defense team tried to prevent the death penalty from being applied by claiming that the accused did not intend to kill the woman or her baby. In March 2006, Yasuda and his group of attorneys were absent from the oral argument hearing for an unknown reason. The Japanese media considered their behavior as a tactic to delay the trial just as they did during the Asahara trial without any legitimate reason; the Supreme Court ordered them to attend the next hearing.

Arrest 
On December 6, 1998, Yasuda was arrested on charges of obstruction of justice (the compulsory seizure of rental income of one of the failed jusen mortgage lenders).  Yasuda was charged with advising the Singaporean real estate developer Sun Chungli and his son Naoaki to set up a dummy company to hide assets. Sun was the president of Sun's Corporation Tokyo Ltd., a major borrower from the several former, now obsolete junsen housing loan companies. Yasuda was accused by the police of conspiring with Sun to hide rental income of approximately 200 million yen by using a dummy company by the name of Wide Treasure. The police suspected that Yasuda instructed the Sun family on how to hide assets. Yasuda acknowledged that he became the legal advisor for Sun in 1991, but argued that he gave advice within a legal framework. Yasuda denied the charges, and claimed he had no involvement in the Wide Treasure operation while the Sun family pleaded guilty. Yasuda was acquitted in 2003.

Yasuda on mass media 
Yasuda's reason for defending the accused who are labelled by society as highly vicious criminals is that he believes their chance of a fair trial is taken away by media bashings. Yasuda fears the recent trend by the media to label people as vicious villains to bury the possibility of a legitimate trial for the accused as a signal of a crisis of democracy in Japan. Yasuda criticizes the premise of modern Japanese law that deviates from justice as the need for assumed innocence has increasingly become a prerequisite for acquittal; he sees this as a crisis in the judicial system.

Movies 
Shikeibengonin was released in theaters on June 30, 2012. It is a documentary directed by Junichi Saito that explores the themes of capital punishment with a special focus on Yoshihiro Yasuda, as a lawyer and activist against the death penalty. The movie is originally based on a TV show that used to air midnights in 2011. The film was also shown Amnesty International Human Rights Documentary Film Show in Hong Kong.

Cast and crew:
Narration: Taro Yamamoto
Director: Junichi Saito
Producer: Katsuhiko Abuno
Music: Shouhei Murai
Music producer: Kozue Okada
Filming: Akihiko Iwai
Editor: Tetsuji Yamamoto

Books 
Shikei Bengonin: Ikiru to Iu Kenri

References

External links 
‘Amnesty International calls for inquiry into arrest of prominent human rights activist’. (In English)
The Yasuda Arrest: Criminal and Political Considerations, Japan Policy Research Institute (In English).

1947 births
Living people
20th-century Japanese lawyers
Japanese anti–death penalty activists
21st-century Japanese lawyers